Agustín Sancho Agustina (18 July 1896 – 25 August 1960) was a Spanish footballer who played as a midfielder for FC Barcelona in the 1920s.

Club career
Born in Benlloc (province of Castellon, Valencia), he moved to Sants in Barcelona as a child, ​​and there he played for various clubs in the neighborhood such as Gladiator de Sants, who was later effectively relaunched as the CE Sants. His good performance with Sants aroused the interest of the main Barcelona clubs and, although he had a pre-agreement with RCD Espanyol, he joined Barcelona in 1916, for whom he played in the next 12 seasons (Sept 1922-23, because he returned to Sants to defend the newly founded UE Sants). He was a member of the legendary FC Barcelona team, coached by Jack Greenwell, that also included Paulino Alcántara, Sagibarba, Ricardo Zamora and Josep Samitier, and together with them, he helped Barcelona to win 9 Catalan championships and four Copa del Rey titles in 1920, 1922, 1925 and 1926. In the 1925 final, Sancho scored Barça's second goal of the night in a 2-0 win over Arenas Club de Getxo.

Annoyed after receiving criticism, especially for his overweight, Sancho asked to leave Barcelona in June 1922, returning to his origins, Sants, where he signed for UE Sants, a new-born club from the merger of FC Internacional and his former club, Unió Esportiva Sants. The Sansense club also offered him a job as a construction contractor for the City Council of Barcelona, because throughout his career, Sancho had combined football with his work as a bricklayer, since professionalism was not recognized in Spain until the end of the 1920s. Sancho spent only a season at Sants as the leaders of FC Barcelona convinced him to rejoin Barça in June 1923.

International career
He appeared in the Spain national team for the 1920 Summer Olympics, featuring in two matches against Belgium and Italy; Spain won the silver medal. He earned a third and last cap on 16 December 1923 in a friendly against Portugal.

As a Barcelona player, he was summoned to play for the Catalonia national team, being a member of the team that won the 1923-24 Prince of Asturias Cup, an inter-regional competition organized by the RFEF. Sancho was a starter in both games of the infamous final against a Castile/Madrid XI, helping Catalonia to a 3-2 win in the replay to assure the team's second title of the competition.

Managerial career
In the summer of 1922, Sancho was on holiday in Castellón at the same time as the local football team was being founded: CE Castellón. Since he was the most experienced and representative footballer in the province, he was offered to lead the first matches of the newly founded. In the following year, he also led some matches in Valencia. Once retired from football, he was José Planas assistant in the technical management of FC Barcelona.

Honours
FC Barcelona
 Copa del Rey: 4 1920, 1922, 1925 and 1926
 Catalan Championship: 9 1918-19, 1919-20, 1920-21, 1921-22, 1923-24, 1924-25, 1925-26, 1926-27, 1927-28

Spain
  Olympic Games: Silver medallist 1920

References

External links

 
 

1896 births
1960 deaths
Spanish footballers
FC Barcelona players
Spanish football managers
CE Sabadell FC managers
Valencia CF managers
Spain international footballers
Footballers at the 1920 Summer Olympics
Olympic footballers of Spain
Olympic silver medalists for Spain
Olympic medalists in football
Medalists at the 1920 Summer Olympics
Association football midfielders
Catalonia international footballers
Footballers from the Valencian Community
Footballers from Barcelona
CF Reus Deportiu managers